"La Musique (Angelica)" is a 2001 song recorded by the contestants of the first edition of French TV reality show Star Academy. The song was released as a single in December 2001 from the album L'Album and also recorded in a live version on the album Live. Cover of a 1960s song, this version achieved a huge success in France in terms of chart positions and sales.

Song information
The song "Angelica" was written by Barry Mann and Cynthia Weil, in English, and first recorded by Mann in 1966. Versions were then recorded by various other artists, including Gene Pitney, The Sandpipers, Scott Walker, and, in 1970, the American singer Oliver, whose version scraped into the Billboard Hot 100 in the US.

In 1967, French singer Nicoletta made her own modified version of the song, under the title "La Musique", but this cover passed unnoticed at the time. Thirty-four years later, this version was covered by Star Academy France which decided to consider this cover as the show's anthem and the lead single from its debut album. Fourteen contestants participated in the recording of the new version which particularly puts foreword the singing.

The song became a smash success in France: it went straight to number-one on December 8, 2001, and stayed there for nine weeks. Then it dropped regularly, totalling 12 weeks in the top ten, 19 weeks in the top 50 and 24 weeks in the top 100. Certified Diamond disc by the SNEP only two weeks after its release, the song became the fifth best-selling single of the 21st century in France, with 1,140,000 units sold.

Track listing
CD single
 "La Musique (Angelica)" (mix radio) — 3:24
 "La Musique (Angelica)" (mix mega) — 3:40
 "La Musique (Angelica)" (instrumental mix radio) — 3:24

Credits and personnel
Mix radio
 Mixed, produced and arranged by SDO and FB Cool for Herbert Music
 Recorded at Studio Heben and at the castle by Yves Jaget

 Mix Mega
 Produced and arranged by SDO and FB Cool for Herbert Music
 Recorded at Studio Heben and at the castle by Yves Jaget
 Guitars : Fabrice Ragot
 Brass : Christian Martinez, Thierry Farrugia and Denis Leloup

Charts and sales

Peak positions

Year-end charts

Certifications

References

2001 singles
Ultratop 50 Singles (Wallonia) number-one singles
SNEP Top Singles number-one singles
Star Academy France songs
Songs written by Barry Mann
1966 songs
Songs with lyrics by Cynthia Weil